Melissa Chiu (born 1972) is a museum director, curator and author, and the director of the Hirshhorn Museum and Sculpture Garden in Washington, DC.

She is a board member of the Association of Art Museum Directors, the American Alliance of Museums, and the Museum Association of New York. She is also on the founding advisory committee for the USC American Academy in China and has participated in the advisory committees for the Gwangju and Shanghai Biennales.

Education 
Born in Darwin, Northern Territory, Australia, in 1972, Chiu was educated in Sydney, where she completed a Bachelor of Arts degree at the University of Western Sydney and then an MA (Arts Administration) at the College of Fine Arts, University of New South Wales. She later completed a PhD at the University of Western Sydney focusing on Chinese contemporary art in the diaspora.

Career 
Chiu worked as an independent curator for several years at the beginning of her career. From 1993 until 1996, she worked at the University of Western Sydney Collection as a curator. In 1996, Chiu collaborated with a group of Asian Australian artists, performers, filmmakers and writers to establish Gallery 4A, a nonprofit contemporary art center devoted to promoting dialogue in the Asia-Pacific region. Chiu was founding Director of Gallery 4A, later renamed the 4A Centre for Contemporary Asian Art. In 2001 she was the curator during the Center's transition to a two-story city owned heritage building in Sydney’s Chinatown.

In 2001, Chiu moved to New York to serve as the Asia Society's curator of contemporary Asian and Asian American art—the first curatorial post of its kind in an American museum.  In 2004, she was appointed Asia Society's museum director. She initiated a number of initiatives at the Asia Society Museum, including the launch of a contemporary art collection to complement the museum's Rockefeller Collection of traditional Asian art. As museum director of the Asia Society, and its vice president of Global Art Programs, she was responsible for programming its Park Avenue museum and future museum facilities under construction in Hong Kong and Houston.

Chiu has curated over thirty international exhibitions mainly focused on the art and artists of Asia. Her major curatorial credits include Zhang Huan: Altered States (2006) and Art and China's Revolution (2008) with Zheng Shengtian, one of the first historical appraisals of Chinese art from the 1950s through 1970s and Nobody's Fool: Yoshitomo Nara (2010) with Miwako Tezuka. She was awarded a Getty Curatorial Research Fellowship in 2004.

Hirshhorn Museum 
Following her 2014 appointment as the first non-American to head the Hirshhorn, Chiu announced the hiring of New York-based Gianni Jetzer as curator-at-large. Jetzer was allowed to maintain his position as a curator for Art Basel, despite the appearance of a conflict of interest.

In August 2015, Chiu announced that the museum's 40th anniversary celebration would be held at 4 World Trade Center in New York. Philip Kennicott, art and architecture critic of The Washington Post, commented that the decision was "deeply troubling and raises concern about where Chiu is taking the organization". The controversy of her decision to move the location of the 40th anniversary to New York from D.C. led to a concern of "missing out on the chance to cultivate critical donors" in Washington.

Publications 
Chiu has published in art magazines and journals, and has authored several books, including Breakout: Chinese Art Outside China (2007), published by Charta and Chinese Contemporary Art: 7 Things You Should Know (2008), published by AW Asia. Her latest books include Contemporary Asian Art with Benjamin Genocchio, published by Thames & Hudson and Monacelli Press, and an edited anthology, Contemporary Art in Asia: A Critical Reader, published by MIT Press.

Other work 
In 2010, Chiu joined the Sunday Arts television show on PBS WNET to conduct a series of interviews with cultural leaders. Interview subjects have included William Kentridge, Shirin Neshat, Yoko Ono, Tan Dun, Chuck Close and Antony Gormley.

In addition to her museum work, Chiu is a regular speaker at international conferences and symposia and has delivered lectures at such institutions as Harvard University, Columbia University, Yale University and the Chinese Central Academy of Fine Arts in Beijing, among others. She was the speaker at the National Gallery of Australia's inaugural Betty Churcher Memorial Lecture in 2022.

Personal life 

Chiu is married to Benjamin Genocchio, an Australian art critic and former editor-in-chief of Artnet News. Chiu and Genocchio co-authored Asian Art Now, originally published in 2010. In September 2015, The Washington Post reported that Genocchio had edited the content of Chiu's Wikipedia entry in order to remove negative commentary about her work at the Hirshhorn and to add laudatory statements.

References

External links 
 "Rising from Obscurity, Asian Art Reflects New York Success", The New York Times

1972 births
Living people
Australian people of Chinese descent
Australian expatriates in the United States
Directors of museums in the United States
Women museum directors
Western Sydney University alumni
University of New South Wales College of Fine Arts alumni
Hirshhorn Museum and Sculpture Garden
Australian art curators
Australian women curators